The Center for Intercultural Dialogue (CID) was established by the Council of Communication Associations (CCA) in March 2010.  Intercultural dialogue occurs when members of different cultural groups, who hold conflicting opinions and assumptions, speak to one another in acknowledgment of those differences. As such, it forms "the heart of what we study when we study intercultural communication."  The goal of CID is double: to encourage research on intercultural dialogue, but to do so through bringing international scholars interested in the subject together in shared intercultural dialogues about their work.

CID is creating an international network, including both scholars and practitioners. CID broadly represents scholars in the discipline of Communication, but has a specific mandate to directly serve those who are members of any member associations of CCA. Since 2016, these have included:

 American Journalism Historians Association
 Association for Business Communication
 Association for Education in Journalism and Mass Communication
 Association of Schools of Journalism and Mass Communication
 Black College Communication Association
 Broadcast Education Association
 International Communication Association
 National Association for Media Literacy Education

When CID was founded in 2010, one other association was a member: 
 National Communication Association

History 

CID was created as a direct result of the National Communication Association's Summer Conference on Intercultural Dialogue, held in Istanbul, Turkey, July 22–26, 2009.    Wendy Leeds-Hurwitz, in her role as Chair of the International and Intercultural Communication Division of NCA, served as conference organizer, and Nazan Haydari, based at Maltepe University in Istanbul, served as local arrangements coordinator.  Other members of the organizing committee were Donal Carbaugh (US), Tamar Katriel (Israel), Kristine Fitch Muñoz (US), Yves Winkin (France), and Saskia Witteborn (Hong Kong).  Support for the conference was provided by both NCA and Maltepe University. Patrice Buzzanell (2011) describes one of the plenary presentations in some detail, and Leeds-Hurwitz (2015) provides a detailed description of the unusual conference design
The Summer Conference resulted in a preconference at the International Communication Association convention in Singapore in 2010, organized by Evelyn Ho. The first publication resulting from the presentations appeared in 2011, in a special issue of the Journal of International and Intercultural Communication, edited by Prue Holmes and Shiv Ganesh.  An edited collection resulting from the Istanbul conference appeared in 2015, edited by Haydari and Holmes. Broome & Collier (2012)  praise the increased attention paid by intercultural scholars to intercultural dialogue as a specific focus, using CID as evidence for this attention.

Participants at the Summer Conference wanted a way to encourage further international connections for intercultural research, and so a proposal was brought before the Council of Communication Associations' Board of Directors at their March 2010 meeting to create the Center for Intercultural Dialogue, which was approved. Wendy Leeds-Hurwitz was appointed Director of CID at that same meeting. The first Advisory Board was approved at the September 2010 meeting, and included: Donal Carbaugh, William Evans, Nazan Haydari, Barbara Hines, Janice Hume, Leena Louhiala-Salminen, Charles Self, Michael Slater, Katerina Sténou and Valerie White. New members of the Board have been appointed every few years since then. Together Board members represent all of the CCA member associations (through overlapping memberships), as well as the applied context of international non-profits. The CID website now serves as a clearinghouse for information on intercultural dialogue topics, and facilitates connections between international scholars by sharing information on publication opportunities, international conferences and positions, graduate school programs, and researcher profiles.

In March 2014, CID co-sponsored a conference with the University of Macau, entitled "Roundtable on Intercultural Dialogue in Asia." A videotape briefly summarizing that event was prepared, and published online.

Dialogue generally, and intercultural dialogue specifically, have been discussed at multiple conferences, and served as the topic of consideration by many organizations over the past few years, becoming a key term and a "preferred form for human action," and Carbaugh specifically lists this CID as one such effort.  Several other organizations have either the same or a similar name. The CID described in this entry is the only one designed to serve the Communication discipline specifically, and to facilitate the study of intercultural dialogue as a research topic by creating an international network of scholars. It is for this reason that CID's slogan is "Bridging Cultures Through Research."

Publications
CID began publishing Key Concepts in Intercultural Dialogue, a set of one page descriptions of technical vocabulary related to intercultural dialogue in various ways, in February 2014. The first few terms were: intercultural dialogue, cosmopolitanism, intercultural competence, coordinated management of meaning, intercultural communication, intercultural capital, and intergroup relations dialogue, with 105 published by 2022. As of November 2014, terms in languages other than English were added, including yuan (Chinese), conscientização (Portuguese), uchi-soto (Japanese), testimonio (Spanish), and interkulturelle Philosophie (German), among others. As of June 2016, concepts were added in translation into a wide range of languages, including Arabic, Belarusian, Chinese, Dutch, Finnish, French, German, Greek, Hebrew, Hindi, Hungarian, Igbo, Indonesian, Italian, Japanese, Kapampangan, Korean, Latvian, Macedonian, Marathi, Nepali, Persian, Polish, Portuguese, Romanian, Russian, Spanish, Tagalog, Turkish, Ukrainian, and Vietnamese. By 2022, translations had been made into 32 languages.

Key Concepts has been used as a model several times by other publications, as for example, LSLP (Literacies in Second Languages Project) Micro-Papers  edited by Raúl Alberto Mora at the Universidad Pontificia Bolivariana in Medellín, Colombia.

CID began publishing a second series in February 2017, Constructing Intercultural Dialogues describing specific case studies of times people managed to engage in intercultural dialogues. These are also being translated, with the first one in Italian published in April 2017. Later series include: CID Posters, turning verbal concepts into visual images, introduced in June 2017; In Dialogue: CID Occasional Papers, started in August 2020 with the goal of providing a place for longer discussions than any of the other publication series; and ICD Exercises, started in November 2020, as a way to share pedagogical techniques.

Logo
Since CID grew out of the NCA Summer Conference on Intercultural Dialogue, all concerned parties agreed to continued use of the logo :File:Center for Intercultural Dialogue logo.jpg designed for that event by Özer Karakuş of Maltepe University. The multiple colors bound together represent cultural diversity and the need for intercultural dialogue. The bridge represents the Bosphorus Bridge in Istanbul, connecting Europe to Asia.

Social media
Due to the efforts of Minh Cao, then Assistant to the Director of CID, a social media presence was established by 2014, and by 2016 there were thousands of followers on one platform or another. This includes a YouTube channel, a Facebook group, a LinkedIn group, as well as Twitter.

Video Competition
In 2018, the first CID Video Competition was established, asking students to prepare short videotapes answering the question "What does intercultural dialogue look like?" Jinsuk Kim of Temple University won first prize. In 2019, the second video competition asked "How do social media influence intercultural dialogue?"  Juanma Marín Cubero and Rafa Muñoz Hernandez of the University of Murcia in Spain won first prize. The third competition asked for entries on how "Listening is where intercultural dialogue starts"; Israel Arcos, a student from Ecuador studying in the USA, won first prize. The top winners' videos each year are added to the CID YouTube site so they are publicly available.

See also
 Council of Communication Associations
 European Year of Intercultural Dialogue
 Intercultural dialogue

References

External links
Center for Intercultural Dialogue
Council of Communication Associations

Communication studies
Communications and media organizations based in the United States
Professional associations based in the United States